In molecular biology, the chloramphenicol phosphotransferase-like protein family includes the chloramphenicol 3-O phosphotransferase (CPT) expressed by Streptomyces venezuelae. Chloramphenicol (Cm) is a metabolite produced by this bacterium that can inhibit ribosomal peptidyl transferase activity and therefore protein production. By transferring a phosphate group to the C-3 hydroxyl group of Cm, CPT inactivates this potentially lethal metabolite.

References 

Protein domains